Stichonodon insignis is a species of characin endemic to Brazil, where it is found in the Amazon Basin.  It is the only member of its genus.

References
 

Characidae
Monotypic fish genera
Fish of South America
Fish of Brazil
Endemic fauna of Brazil
Taxa named by Carl H. Eigenmann
Taxa named by Franz Steindachner
Fish described in 1876